John Headlam (b Gateshead 1 April 1770; d Wycliffe, North Riding 4 May 1854) was Archdeacon of Richmond from 30 December 1826 until his death.

Headlam was educated at Lincoln College, Oxford, matriculating in 1786, and graduating B.A. in 1790, M.A. in 1792. For many years he was the Rector of Wycliffe, in the North Riding of Yorkshire. He was also Chancellor of Ripon from 1846.

References

1770 births
Archdeacons of Richmond
1854 deaths
People from Gateshead
Alumni of Lincoln College, Oxford